Saltoblattella montistabularis is a species of jumping cockroach known only from Table Mountain near Cape Town, South Africa. Both the species and genus were newly described in 2009. Researchers nicknamed the species leaproach. Its jumping mechanism is similar in anatomical features and in performance to grasshoppers with which it shares its habitat. Like grasshoppers, it is able to jump between grass and sedge stems. Its ability to jump is unique among the approximately 4,000 known species of cockroaches. Since the discovery and description of S. montistabularis in 2009 at least 2 more species have been discovered - one from the Cape Cederberg, one from Bredasdorp and a third with black and white stripes from Mossel Bay and Nature's Valley. All these are in the fynbos belt along the southern Cape coast.

Etymology
The generic name, Saltoblattella is a compound Latin word that translates as "jumping small cockroach."

Morphology
The new species is characterized by a series of features unique among extant cockroaches. Many of the specializations are apparently jumping adaptations, reflected in unusual morphology of eyes, antennae, legs and tergite glands. Its hind legs are significantly enlarged, unlike typical cockroaches which have legs of similar size and structure.

References

External links
 YouTube video: S. montistabularis jumping in slow motion

Cockroaches
Insects described in 2009
Endemic insects of South Africa
Table Mountain